Collegiate is a 1936 American musical film directed by Ralph Murphy and written by Walter DeLeon, Francis Martin and Alice Duer Miller. The film stars Joe Penner, Jack Oakie, Ned Sparks, Frances Langford, Betty Grable and Lynne Overman. The film was released on January 22, 1936, by Paramount Pictures.

The film is a remake of the 1921 silent film The Charm School.

Plot

The irresponsible Jerry Craig inherits a school from an aunt. He goes there with pal Sourpuss and press agent Scoop, transforms the place into a charm school encounters a stranger named Joe who becomes a financial benefactor.

The school's a huge success. Jerry's loyalties are torn between his fiancée Eunice and secretary Juliet, then complications develop when Joe doesn't turn out to be who he seems to be.

Cast 
Joe Penner as Joe
Jack Oakie as Jerry Craig
Ned Sparks as 'Scoop' Oakland
Frances Langford as Miss Hay
Betty Grable as Dorothy
Lynne Overman as Sour-Puss 
Betty Jane Cooper as Dance Instructress
Mack Gordon as Mack Gordon
Harry Revel as Harry Revel
Julius Tannen as Detective Browning
Nora Cecil as Miss Curtiss
Henry Kolker as Mr. MacGregor

References

External links 
 
 

1936 films
Paramount Pictures films
American musical films
1936 musical films
Films directed by Ralph Murphy
American black-and-white films
1930s English-language films
1930s American films